Ivana Višić Vervoort (born 7 October 1980) is a Croatian former professional tennis player.

A top-10 junior, Višić was a girls' doubles semi-finalist at the Australian Open and US Open.

Višić reached a career high singles ranking of 406 in the world while competing on the professional tour and featured in the doubles main draw of two WTA Tour tournaments. In 1998 she and Kristina Pojatina were lucky loser entrants at the Makarska International Championships and then in 1999 she partnered with Marijana Kovačević at the Croatian Bol Ladies Open, both times losing in the first round.

During her career she won two doubles titles on the ITF Women's Circuit.

ITF finals

Singles: 1 (0–1)

Doubles: 5 (2–3)

References

External links
 
 

1980 births
Living people
Croatian female tennis players